In chemistry, the Halcon process refers to technology for the production of propylene oxide by oxidation of propylene with  tert-butyl hydroperoxide.  The reaction requires metal catalysts, which typically contain molybdenum:
(CH3)3COOH  +  CH2=CHCH3  → (CH3)3COH  +  CH2OCHCH3 
The byproduct tert-butanol is recycled or converted to other useful compounds.  The process once operated at the scale of >2 billion kg/y.

The lighter analogue of propylene oxide, ethylene oxide, is produced by silver-catalyzed reaction of ethylene with oxygen.  Attempts to implement this relatively simple technology to the conversion of propylene to propylene oxide fail.  Instead only combustion predominates.  The problems are attributed to the sensitivity of allylic C-H bonds.

Mechanism
The oxidation is thought to proceed by formation of Mo(η2-O2-tert-Bu) complexes.  The peroxy O center is rendered highly electrophilic, leading to attack on the alkene.

History
The Halcon process was developed by Halcon International.

References

Catalysis